Diane Keaton is an American actress. She has received various awards including an Academy Award, British Academy Film Award and a Golden Globe Award for her performance in Woody Allen's Annie Hall (1977). Keaton also received three other Academy Award nominations for Reds (1981), Marvin's Room (1996), and Something's Gotta Give (2003). Keaton also received a Primetime Emmy Award, and Daytime Emmy Award nominations.

Major associations

Academy Awards

BAFTA Awards

Emmy Awards

Golden Globe Awards

Screen Actors Guild Awards

Tony Awards

Critics awards

Alliance of Women Film Journalists Awards

Critics Choice Movie Awards

Dallas-Fort Worth Film Critics Association

Iowa Film Critics Awards

Kansas City Film Critics Circle Awards

Los Angeles Film Critics Association

National Board of Review Awards

National Society of Film Critics Awards

New York Film Critics Circle Awards

Phoenix Film Critics Society Awards

Southeastern Film Critics Association

Washington DC Area Film Critics Association

Miscellaneous awards

AARP Movies for Grownups Awards

American Comedy Awards

Zurich Film Festival

Behind the Voice Actors Awards

People's Choice Awards

Santa Barbara International Film Festival

David di Donatello Awards

Fontogramas de Plata

Italian Online Movie Awards

Monte-Carlo TV Festival

Online awards

Awards Circuit Community Awards

CableACE Awards

Online Film & Television Association Awards

Prism Awards

Satellite Awards

Negative awards

Golden Raspberry Awards

The Stinkers Bad Movie Awards

References

External links
 

Keaton, Diane